John Patrick "Pat" Bieter (March 13, 1930 – January 27, 1999) was an American politician and educator who served as a member of the Idaho House of Representatives from 1996 until his death in 1999. Following his death in a car accident in 1999, his son Dave Bieter succeeded him in the house and later served as the long-time mayor of Boise.

Early life and education 
Bieter was born on March 13, 1930, in Devils Lake, North Dakota. He earned a Bachelor of Arts in History from the University of St. Thomas, Master of Arts in History from the University of California, Berkeley, and Doctor of Education from the University of Idaho.

Career 
Bieter served in the United States Air Force and was stationed at the Mountain Home Air Force Base, where he met his wife. After studying at the University of California, Berkeley, Bieter returned to Idaho and began teaching at Boise Junior High School. He worked for an additional 12 years in the Boise School District, including as assistant principal of Borah High School.

Bieter became active in Boise, Idaho's Basque community and established the Basque studies program at Boise State University, taking 75 students, seven faculty, and his wife and five children to live in the Franco-era Basque Country for the 1974–75 academic year.

Bieter was elected to serve in the Idaho House of Representatives in 1996, representing the District 19, which consists of a portion of Ada County, Idaho. He was a Democrat.

Personal life 
Bieter married Eloise (née Garmendia), the daughter of immigrants from Basque Country, in 1955. They had five children, including Dave Bieter, who succeeded Pat in the Idaho House of Representatives and served as the 55th Mayor of Boise from 2004 to 2020.

Death 
Bieter and his wife died on January 27, 1999, near Banks, Idaho, in a car accident.

References 

1930 births
1999 deaths
Democratic Party members of the Idaho House of Representatives
UC Berkeley College of Letters and Science alumni
University of Idaho alumni
University of St. Thomas (Minnesota) alumni
People from Devils Lake, North Dakota
Military personnel from North Dakota
Road incident deaths in Idaho
20th-century American politicians